The 1911 Saint Louis Billikens football team was an American football team that represented Saint Louis University during the 1911 college football season. In their second and final season under head coach John R. Bender, the Billikens compiled a 7–1–2 record.

Schedule

References

Saint Louis
Saint Louis Billikens football seasons
Saint Louis Billikens football